Not of the Woman Born (German: Der nicht vom Weibe Geborene) is a 1918 German silent film directed by Franz Eckstein and Rosa Porten and starring Ferry Eschenauer, Helene Stein, and Conrad Veidt.

Cast
 Ferry Eschenauer as Junker Caspar 
 Helene Stein as Sibyllas Kammerfrau Brigitte 
 Conrad Veidt as Satan 
 Rolf Nordegg as Konrad 
 Hermann Seldeneck as Ulrich Freiherr von Eynsidel 
 Ly Neumann as Tochter Walpurga 
 Ernst Wehlau as Graf Hermann von Castell 
 Gustav Schmitt as alter Diener 
 Sylva Mann as junge Zigeunerin Prisca

References

Bibliography
 Bock, Hans-Michael & Bergfelder, Tim. The Concise CineGraph. Encyclopedia of German Cinema. Berghahn Books, 2009.

External links

1918 films
Films of the German Empire
German silent feature films
Films directed by Franz Eckstein
Films directed by Rosa Porten
German black-and-white films
1910s German films